Camoufleur is the fifth and final studio album by American indie rock band Gastr del Sol, released on February 23, 1998 on Drag City.

Critical reception

Stephen Thomas Erlewine of AllMusic described Camoufleur as "a subdued, meditative affair, bringing together elements of folk, jazz, film music, and the avant-garde", which gradually "opens up, revealing layers of modest beauty". Entertainment Weekly critic Rob Brunner found that it showed Gastr del Sol's music continuing to become "less obtuse", praising the album as "their most listenable — and ambitious — work yet". Joshua Klein of The A.V. Club felt that its "move toward more standard song structures, while not a radical revamp, sounds fresh and enjoyable."

In 2018, Pitchfork placed Camoufleur at number 38 on its list of the 50 best albums of 1998. In an accompanying write-up, staff writer Marc Hogan described the album as "meticulous, introspective chamber-pop, unfurling a bit like Van Dyke Parks' work with Brian Wilson." Fact ranked it as the tenth best post-rock album of all time in a 2016 list.

Track listing

Personnel
Credits adapted from liner notes.
 Jim O'Rourke – composition, performance, recording
 David Grubbs – composition, performance
 Markus Popp – composition, performance
 Edith Frost – vocals
 Stephen Prina – vocals
 Darin Gray – bass guitar
 John McEntire – drums, recording
 Steven Butters – steel drums
 Jeb Bishop – trombone
 Rob Mazurek – cornet
 Ken Vandermark – clarinet
 Jeremy Ronkin – French horn
 Julie Pomerleau – viola, violin
 Maureen Loughnane – violin
 Phil Bonnet – recording
 Markus Oehlen – artwork

References

External links
 

1998 albums
Gastr del Sol albums
Drag City (record label) albums
Domino Recording Company albums
P-Vine Records albums